Séféto is a small town and principal settlement of the commune of Séféto Ouest in the Cercle of Kita in the Kayes Region of south-western Mali.

References

Populated places in Kayes Region